Alessandro De Marchi (born 19 May 1986) is an Italian professional road and track bicycle racer who currently rides for UCI WorldTeam .

Career
Born in San Daniele del Friuli, De Marchi has competed as a professional since the start of the 2011 season, joining the  squad after a stagiaire spell with the team at the end of the 2010 season.

In the 2012 Giro d'Italia, De Marchi twice featured in a breakaway, during the fifth and fourteenth stages. In the latter stage, De Marchi made it to the end of the stage with the breakaway and finished third, behind Andrey Amador and Jan Bárta; the result came on his 26th birthday.

In the 2014 Tour de France, De Marchi was twice declared the 'most combative' rider of a stage, and earned the Tour's overall combativity award. De Marchi claimed his first Grand Tour stage win on Stage 7 of the 2014 Vuelta a España via an early breakaway and he finished solo.

 announced that De Marchi would be joining them for the 2015 season.

In September 2020, De Marchi signed a two-year contract with the  team.

After a strong result in stage 4 of the 2021 Giro d'Italia, De Marchi wore the pink leader's jersey for the following 2 stages. Early in stage 12 of the same race, De Marchi crashed and was taken away in an ambulance. His team later reported that he had broken his right collarbone, six ribs and his first two thoracic vertebrae.

Major results

2007
 1st  Team pursuit, National Track Championships
 Athens Open Balkan Championship
1st Team pursuit
3rd Individual pursuit
 1st Trofeo Marlene-Bracciale Inseguitore
 1st Stage 3 Giro Ciclisto Pesche Nettarine di Romagna
 2nd Coppa San Vito
 2nd Trofeo e Gran Premio Banca Credito Cooperativo del Metauro
 4th Trofeo Martiri dell'Oreno
 4th Piccola Sanremo
 5th Gran Premio Pretola
2008
 1st Trofeo Città di Conegliano
 1st GP Folignano
 2nd Giro dei Tre Ponti
 3rd Memorial Morgan Capretta
 3rd Gran Premio Santa Maria dei Lumi
 4th Trofeo Marlene–Bracciale Inseguitore
 5th Circuito del Termen
 6th Trofeo Gianfranco Bianchin
 10th Overall Giro del Friuli-Venezia Giulia
2009
 1st Giro della Provincia di Biella
 1st Gran Premio Città di Verona
 4th Ruota d'Oro
 4th Ljubljana–Zagreb
 5th Gran Premio Fiera del Riso
 7th Gran Premio di Poggiana
 8th Memorial Pigoni Coli
 8th Giro del Casentino
 9th Coppa Città di San Daniele
2010
 3rd Gran Premio Città di Saltino Vallombrosa
 4th Overall Tour of Romania
 4th Coppa Comune di Castiglion Fiorentino
 6th Coppa Città di San Daniele
 7th Coppa Caduti di Reda
 8th Trofeo Matteotti
 8th Vicenze–Bionde
 8th Gran Premio Camon
2011
 National Track Championships
1st  Team pursuit
2nd  Individual pursuit
 1st Stage 1b (TTT) Settimana Internazionale di Coppi e Bartali
 3rd Tre Giorni Citta di Pordenone
 6th Giro dell'Appennino
2013
 1st Stage 8 Critérium du Dauphiné
 4th Road race, National Road Championships
 6th Prueba Villafranca de Ordizia
2014
 1st Stage 7 Vuelta a España
 1st  Mountains classification, Critérium du Dauphiné
 9th Overall Tour des Fjords
 Tour de France
 Combativity award Stages 13, 14 & Overall
2015
 Vuelta a España
1st Stages 1 (TTT) & 14
2016
 1st Stage 1 (TTT) Tirreno–Adriatico
 6th Overall Tour La Provence
 9th Giro di Lombardia
2017
 1st Stage 1 (TTT) Vuelta a España
 1st Stage 2 (TTT) Volta a Catalunya
 1st Stage 1 (TTT) Volta a la Comunitat Valenciana
2018
 1st Giro dell'Emilia
 1st Stage 11 Vuelta a España
 1st Stage 1 (TTT) Tour de Suisse
 1st Stage 3 (TTT) Volta a la Comunitat Valenciana
 4th Time trial, National Road Championships
2019
 3rd Time trial, National Road Championships
 7th Amstel Gold Race
2020
 2nd Time trial, National Road Championships
 9th Gran Trittico Lombardo
2021
 1st  Team relay, UEC European Road Championships
 1st Tre Valli Varesine
 1st  Mountains classification, Tour of the Alps
 1st Stage 1b (TTT) Settimana Internazionale di Coppi e Bartali
 2nd Giro della Toscana
 3rd Chrono des Nations
 4th Overall Tour Poitou-Charentes en Nouvelle-Aquitaine
  Giro d'Italia
Held  after Stages 4–5
2022
 5th Giro del Veneto
 7th UCI World Gravel Championships
  Combativity award Stage 4 Vuelta a España

Grand Tour general classification results timeline

References

External links

 
 
 
 

Italian male cyclists
1986 births
Living people
People from San Daniele del Friuli
Cyclists from Friuli Venezia Giulia
Italian Vuelta a España stage winners
2014 Vuelta a España stage winners
Cyclists at the 2016 Summer Olympics
Olympic cyclists of Italy